Anna Stetsenko (born April 18, 1992) is a visually impaired Ukrainian Paralympic swimmer, competing in S13 class. She has won four gold medals in Summer Paralympics and two in the world championships. She also holds two current World records: in 50 m and 100 m freestyle.

References

External links 
 

1992 births
Living people
Ukrainian female freestyle swimmers
Paralympic swimmers of Ukraine
Paralympic gold medalists for Ukraine
Paralympic silver medalists for Ukraine
Paralympic bronze medalists for Ukraine
Paralympic medalists in swimming
Swimmers at the 2016 Summer Paralympics
Swimmers at the 2020 Summer Paralympics
Medalists at the 2016 Summer Paralympics
Medalists at the 2020 Summer Paralympics
Medalists at the World Para Swimming Championships
Medalists at the World Para Swimming European Championships
Ukrainian female backstroke swimmers
Ukrainian female medley swimmers
S13-classified Paralympic swimmers
Sportspeople from Donetsk Oblast